Håkon Johannessen (24 December 1912 – 18 September 1978) was a Norwegian footballer. He played in two matches for the Norway national football team from 1933 to 1937.

References

External links
 

1912 births
1978 deaths
Norwegian footballers
Norway international footballers
Place of birth missing
Association footballers not categorized by position